Ben Bradshaw (born 1960) is a British politician.

Ben or Benjamin Bradshaw may also refer to:

Benjamin Bradshaw (1879–1960), American wrestler
Ben Bradshaw (magician), Australian magician and escapologist